Lophobates is a genus of moths in the family Geometridae described by Warren in 1899.

Species
Lophobates ochreicostata Warren, 1899 north-eastern Himalayas
Lophobates mesotoechia (Prout, 1926) Borneo

References

Boarmiini